Admiral William Hotham, 1st Baron Hotham (1736–1813) was an officer in the Royal Navy. He was the son of Sir Beaumont Hotham (died 1771), a lineal descendant of Sir John Hotham.

Biography
Hotham was educated at Westminster School and at the Royal Naval Academy, Portsmouth. He entered the navy in 1751, and spent most of his midshipman's time in American waters. In 1755 he became lieutenant in Admiral Sir Edward Hawke's flagship St George and he soon received a small command, which led gradually to higher posts. In Syren (20) he fought a sharp action with the French Telemaque of superior force, and in the sloop Fortune he carried, by boarding, a 26-gun privateer.

For this service, he was rewarded with a more powerful ship, and from 1757 onwards commanded various frigates. In 1759 his ship Melampe, with Southampton, fought a spirited action with two hostile frigates of similar force, one of which became their prize. Melampe was attached to Augustus Keppel's squadron in 1761, but was in the main employed in detached duty and made many captures. In 1776, as a Commodore, Hotham served in North American waters, and he had a great share in the Battle of St. Lucia (15 December 1778).

Here he continued till the spring of 1781, when he was sent home in charge of a large convoy of merchantmen. Off Scilly Hotham fell in with a powerful French squadron, against which he could effect nothing, and many of the merchant-men went to France as prizes.

In 1782 Commodore Hotham was with Richard Howe at the relief of Gibraltar, and at the time of the Spanish armament of 1790 he flew his flag as Rear-admiral of the red. By 1791 he was made vice admiral. He hoisted his flag aboard HMS Britannia that year. As Lord Hood's second-in-command in the Mediterranean, from August 1793, he was engaged against the French Revolutionary navy, and when his chief retired to England in December the command of the Mediterranean Fleet devolved upon him. On 13 March 1795 he fought an indecisive fleet action at the Naval Battle of Genoa, in which the brunt of the fighting was borne by Captain Horatio Nelson, and some months later, now a full admiral, he again engaged a French fleet, at the Naval Battle of Hyères Islands on 13 July 1795, this time under conditions which might have permitted a decisive victory; of this affair, Nelson wrote home that it was a "miserable action."

In November 1795, he was replaced as commander of the Mediterranean Fleet by Admiral Jervis and returned to England, and in 1797 he was made a peer of Ireland under the title of Baron Hotham of South Dalton, near Hull. He died in 1813. According to the Encyclopædia Britannica Eleventh Edition, Hotham lacked the fiery energy and genius of a Nelson or a Jervis, but in subordinate positions, he was a brave and capable officer.

As Hotham died unmarried, his barony passed to his brother, Sir Beaumont Hotham (1737–1814), who became 2nd Baron Hotham in May 1813. Beaumont, who was a baron of the exchequer for thirty years, died on 4 March 1814, and was succeeded as 3rd baron by his grandson Beaumont Hotham (1794–1870), who was present at the Battle of Waterloo, being afterwards a member of parliament for forty-eight years. He died unmarried in December 1870 and was succeeded by his nephew, Charles (1836–1872), and then by another nephew, John (1838–1907). In 1907 his cousin Frederick William (born 1863) became the 6th baron. Other distinguished members of this family were the 2nd baron's son, Sir Henry Hotham (1777–1833), a vice-admiral, who saw a great deal of service during the Napoleonic Wars; and Sir William Hotham (1772–1848), a nephew of the 1st baron, who served with Adam Duncan in 1797 at the Battle of Camperdown and elsewhere.

References

Ships of the RN

|-

1736 births
1813 deaths
People educated at Westminster School, London
Royal Navy admirals
Royal Navy personnel of the French Revolutionary Wars
Barons in the Peerage of Ireland
Peers of Ireland created by George III
Royal Navy personnel of the American Revolutionary War